Sedliská  is a village and municipality in Vranov nad Topľou District in the Prešov Region of eastern Slovakia.

History
In historical records the village was first mentioned in 1323.

Geography
The municipality lies at an altitude of 160 metres and covers an area of 10.133 km2. It has a population of about 1287 people.

References

External links
 
 
 http://www.statistics.sk/mosmis/eng/run.html

Villages and municipalities in Vranov nad Topľou District